The Australian Electoral Commission (AEC) is the independent federal agency in charge of organising, conducting and supervising federal Australian elections, by-elections and referendums.

Responsibilities
The AEC's main responsibility is to conduct federal elections, by-elections and referendums. The AEC is also responsible for the maintenance of up-to-date electoral rolls, devising electorate boundaries, apportionments and redistributions. Under the Joint Roll Arrangements, the AEC maintains electoral rolls for the whole of Australia, other than Western Australia, which is used by the state and territory Electoral Commissions to conduct their elections. The AEC publishes detailed election results and follows up electors who had failed to vote or who have voted multiple times in an election.

The AEC is also responsible for registering political parties intending to field candidates at federal elections, monitoring the activities of those political parties, including receiving returns from parties of donations and expenditures, and the publication of the information. The AEC also plays an electoral education role, aiming to educate citizens about the electoral process by which representatives are elected, and by which the Australian Constitution is changed (referendums). It also plays a role in industrial voting and protected action ballots (e.g., votes on industrial action).

The rules for federal elections are contained in the Commonwealth Electoral Act 1918, while the rules for referendums are contained in the Referendum (Machinery Provisions) Act 1984.

Registration of political parties
The formal registration of political parties in Australia commenced in New South Wales in 1981 and 1984 for the Commonwealth. The AEC is required to maintain a register of political parties. Such registration is required before a party can field candidates, receive public funding, have party identification on ballot papers and use above-the-line ticket voting.

In all jurisdictions, conditions relating to a party name require party names to have a maximum of six words, not be obscene and not to resemble the name of another, unrelated party, be likely to cause confusion with another party nor contain the word 'independent' or 'independent party'.

All Australian jurisdictions also have a minimum membership requirement, which differs widely, especially when compared with the total number of people enrolled in the jurisdiction. These range from 100 in the ACT and Tasmania, 200 in SA, 500 in Vic and WA, 1,500 for the Commonwealth and 750 in New South Wales. Four jurisdictions require a fee for registration: $500 for the Commonwealth, Victoria and the Northern Territory; and $2,000 for New South Wales.

Public funding of political parties 

Since 1984, Australian political parties have been publicly funded by the AEC. The objective of public funding is to reduce the influence of private money upon elections, and consequently, the influence of private money upon the shaping of public policy. After each election, the AEC distributes a set amount of money to each political party, per vote received. A candidate or Senate group needs 4% of the primary vote to be eligible for public funding.

After the 2013 election, political parties and candidates received $58.1 million in election funding, with the funding rate being 248.800 cents per vote. The Liberal Party received $23.9 million, as part of the Coalition total of $27.2 million, while the Labor Party received $20.8 million. Other significant recipients were Australian Greens with $5.5 million, Palmer United Party with $2.3 million, and Liberal Democratic Party with $1.0 million.

In 2016, $62.7 million was distributed, with the funding rate being 262.784 cents per vote.

Electoral roll 
One of the functions of the AEC is the maintenance of the electoral roll, which in some other countries are called electoral registers. In Australia voter registration is called "enrolment". The AEC maintains Australia's federal electoral roll, which is used for federal elections, by-elections and referendums. Australia has maintained a permanent federal electoral roll since 1908 and, by amendment to the Commonwealth Electoral Act, enrolment has been compulsory for federal elections since 1924. The requirement to register then applied to "British subjects" over the age of 21.

Though each state and territory also has its own electoral commission or office, voters need to register only with the AEC, which shares the registration details with the relevant state electoral commission. The federal roll also forms the basis of state (except in Victoria and Western Australia, which maintain their own rolls) and local electoral rolls.

AEC registration covers federal, state and local voter registration. In Australia and in each state and territory, it is a legal offence to fail to vote (or, at the very least, attend a polling station and have one's name crossed off the roll) at any federal or state election, punishable by a nominal fine. The amount varies between federal and state elections. (The fine for not voting is currently A$75.00 in Victoria. This figure is indexed at the beginning of every financial year.) Usually people are issued with warnings when it is found that they have not voted, and they are given an opportunity to show cause. Acceptable reasons for not voting may include being in the accident department of a hospital, being ill (requires confirmation), being out of the country on election day, religious objections, being incarcerated, etc. "I forgot" is not considered acceptable and will incur a fine. Section 245 of the Electoral Act (Cwth) provides that if an elector has been asked the "true reason" for his failure to vote states that he did not do so because it was against his religion, this statement shall be regarded as conclusive, and no further action will be taken.

Traditionally, voters cannot register within three weeks of an election. In 2004 the Howard government passed legislation that prevented registration after 8 pm on the day that the writs were issued (this can be up to 10 days after the election has been announced). This legislation was considered controversial by some Australians who contended it disenfranchised first-time voters or those who have forgotten to update their enrolment. The law was repealed just before the 2010 federal election, after advocacy group GetUp! obtained a High Court ruling that the changes were unconstitutional. 16 and 17 year olds can provisionally enrol and are able to vote when they turn 18.

History and structure
The Commonwealth Electoral Act 1902 set up the framework for the Commonwealth electoral system, which was administered until 1916 as a branch of the Department of Home Affairs, then until 1928 by the Department of Home and Territories, back to Department of Home Affairs until 1932 and then Department of the Interior until 1972. The Australian Electoral Office was created in 1973 by the Australian Electoral Office Act 1973. On 21 February 1984 the Australian Electoral Commission (AEC) was established as a Commonwealth statutory authority.

The AEC is answerable to the Joint Standing Committee on Electoral Matters of the Parliament of Australia, and must report on how elections were carried out and the success of elections in general.

The AEC was created by and operates under the Commonwealth Electoral Act 1918. It consists of a chairman (a judge or a retired judge of the federal court), the electoral commissioner and a non-judicial member (usually the Australian Statistician). The electoral commissioner has the powers of a secretary of a department under the Public Service Act 1999 and the Financial Management and Accountability Act 1998. The chairperson and the third, non-judicial member both hold their offices on a part-time basis.

Each House of Representatives electorate has a Divisional Returning Officer responsible for administration of elections within the division. Each State also has an Australian Electoral Officer responsible for administration of Senate elections. The AEC has a National Office in Canberra and an office in each State and Territory: Adelaide, Brisbane, Darwin, Hobart, Melbourne, Perth and Sydney.

After the loss of 1,400 ballots during the recount for the 2013 Western Australia Senate election and the subsequent 2014 special election, the AEC came under significant scrutiny, leading to the resignation of Commissioner Ed Killesteyn.

List of Australian Electoral Commissioners

See also

Albert Langer
Electoral system of Australia
Compulsory voting
Getup Ltd v Electoral Commissioner

Electoral commissions of each state and self governing territory:
 Australian Capital Territory Electoral Commission
 New South Wales Electoral Commission
 Northern Territory Electoral Commission
 Electoral Commission of Queensland
 Electoral Commission of South Australia
 Tasmanian Electoral Commission
 Victorian Electoral Commission
 Western Australian Electoral Commission

Notes

External links
The Australian Electoral Commission website
The Electoral Council of Australia and New Zealand website, the consultative council between the AEC, New Zealand, state and territory electoral authorities
Commonwealth Electoral Act 1918
Referendum (Machinery Provisions) Act 1984

Elections in Australia
Australia
1902 establishments in Australia
Commonwealth Government agencies of Australia
Election commissions
Government agencies established in 1902